Blown Away is a 1994 American action thriller film directed by Stephen Hopkins and starring Jeff Bridges, Tommy Lee Jones, Forest Whitaker, Suzy Amis, and Lloyd Bridges. The film was distributed and financed by MGM, a studio which was in financial difficulty at the time. The head of the studio was former Paramount executive Frank Mancuso Sr.

It was the first action film starring Jeff Bridges, who was by then a 45-year old leading man. Bridges said he was always interested in the genre, particularly as his father, Lloyd Bridges (who co-stars in the film) appeared in High Noon fighting Gary Cooper. Hopkins said that Bridges was his first choice to play the lead. "I was very lucky that MGM backed me up, because he doesn't seem to be the obvious choice for this kind of genre film."

Plot
Irish Republican Army fighter Ryan Gaerity escapes from his cell in a castle prison in Northern Ireland after turning a toilet into a bomb, killing a guard and his cellmate in the process.

In Boston, Lieutenant James "Jimmy" Dove is a veteran member of the police force's bomb squad, on the verge of retirement and helping to train newer recruits. Dove hides that he is really Liam McGivney, a former member of a Northern Ireland terrorist cell. He had been friends with Gaerity, but when Gaerity tried to set off a bomb that would have killed numerous civilians, he interceded, ending in the death of his girlfriend (Gaerity's sister), and leading to Gaerity's imprisonment. Devastated, McGivney moved to Boston and took on a new identity, hoping to find atonement in saving others by defusing bombs. Only Dove's uncle, retired Boston police officer Max O'Bannon, is aware of his past and encourages Dove to retire early, feeling he has done his penance.

Gaerity sees Dove on TV and makes his way to Boston, taking residence in an abandoned casino boat. He takes a job as a janitor at the police station to learn more about Dove's present life and his co-workers. Gaerity sets up bombs specifically designed to kill the rest of the bomb squad: the first victim, Blanket, is killed by a bomb placed under a bridge on the night of Dove's wedding to his fiancee Kate. Later, at the site of a fake bomb threat, technicians Rita and Cortez are killed by an explosive hidden in their bomb disposal robot. Dove receives a call from Gaerity and realizes that Kate and his stepdaughter Elizabeth are in danger. He rushes home and finds no bomb, but his dog, "Boomer," has been killed.  He explains his true past to Kate, and convinces her and Elizabeth to go into hiding at Max's seaside cottage. Gaerity's third bomb almost kills rookie technician Anthony Franklin, who has linked Dove's former life to Gaerity, but Dove rescues him and Franklin promises Dove any assistance he can offer.

Max decides to try to stop Gaerity himself, trying to get close to him at an Irish bar, but instead ends up captured by him, and latched into a makeshift bomb. Dove tracks down Max, and goes to retrieve his tools, but Max, realizing that Gaerity had created the bomb to kill both of them, intentionally triggers the bomb while Dove is away, sacrificing himself. In analyzing the bomb's debris, Dove finds a roulette ball that points to the abandoned ship, where he finds Gaerity. Gaerity reveals that he has set up another bomb in Kate's car and arms it via radio signal, then activates a Rube Goldberg-esque mechanism to trigger an even larger set of explosives that will destroy the ship.  Dove engages with Gaerity in a large mêlée fight throughout the ship. Dove gains the upper hand, and handcuffs himself to Gaerity, preventing him from leaving, preparing to die to keep his secret and prevent any more deaths. Dove is saved by Franklin at the last second, having followed Dove to the ship, and the two escape in time before the ship explodes, killing Gaerity in the process.

The two race back to the city, hoping to stop Kate before she starts the car. They arrive too late but are able to catch up to Kate, and Dove jumps into her car. He finds the complex bomb and manages to defuse it in time. As they recover, Franklin tells Dove he knows his past identity but will keep it a secret if he can take credit for taking down Gaerity; Dove agrees and gives Franklin his beeper before leaving with Kate and Lizzie.

Cast

Production
Stephen Hopkins, who agreed to do the film after completing Judgment Night, told his agent, " 'I don't want to make a movie about a bomb squad!' But he insisted, which he very rarely does, so I read it and thought it was terrific. Forty-eight hours later, the deal was done, bang."

"I would say the movie is, hopefully, more of a suspense film, which is more interesting to me than that type of movie where we see a bunch of explosions", said Hopkins. "I was attracted because there were a bunch of great characters who obviously would attract great actors to do them. And also the suspense bit; there's so many different types of suspense in the film. There are some fun suspense scenes, and there are some very emotionally intense scenes."

"You can make violence into a fantasy situation or you can try and make it relatable", said Hopkins. "If you bring it down to as realistic terms as possible under the circumstances, then for me it becomes more interesting than to be out there with larger-than-life superhuman types in glossy, glamorous situations. There's some politically incorrect things about this film I like which aren't usually allowed in these kind of films. The hero did make mistakes, he lied to his wife, he lies to his friends all the way through the film, he feels guilty and acts irresponsibly, he gives up. Normally I find now that everyone has to be perfect."

Casting
Hopkins says that Bridges' casting "opens up a whole bunch of actors who really want to work with him."

"I was looking for an action film", said Jeff Bridges. "So I read a lot of scripts, looking for one that transcended the genre. I wanted something that had a little more depth -- that had genuine characters and relationships. What appealed to me about this script was that you cared about the people."

Richard Harris was going to play Bridges' mentor. However the role ended up being played by Bridges' father Lloyd. The producers made Lloyd Bridges audition because they associated the actor with comedies.

Another actor new to the genre was Forest Whitaker, who wanted to play "a character that could walk into a room and say: 'I'm the best. Stick around and maybe you'll learn something from me.

Filming
Filming was scheduled to start August 24 in Massachusetts. It was the biggest budget movie ever to be made in Massachusetts until that time. The Boston Bomb Squad acted as consultants.

Hopkins used microphotography and expanded digital sound effects to get right inside the bombs. "I thought it was a great way of using sound and visuals", he said. "You can increase the visceral response to the scene. You can suddenly cut to this big marble hanging there and hear it `Whooosh!' all around. You're sort of able to change the world, to go in and really see what's going on."

The climactic ship explosion was so powerful it shattered 8,000 windows in East Boston during filming.

Paul Hill, one of the Guildford Four who had been wrongly imprisoned in the UK, helped the filmmakers with background information.

Release and reception
MGM advertised the film heavily, spending $7 million on television spots.

Box office
Blown Away opened at fourth place in its opening weekend at the US box office, with $10.5 million, which at the time was MGM's biggest opening weekend ever. This was still MGM's biggest opening in a decade. "This puts us back in the mainstream of movie distribution", said Larry Gleason, MGM's president of worldwide theatrical distribution."

It finished its run with $30 million in the United States and Canada and grossed $22.7 million internationally for a worldwide total of $52.7 million.

The film suffered in comparison to another "terrorist with a bomb" movie, Speed, which was rushed into cinemas to beat Blown Away.

Critical response
On Rotten Tomatoes the film holds an approval rating of 41% based on 22 reviews, with an average rating of 5.2/10. Audiences polled by CinemaScore gave the film an average grade of "B" on an A+ to F scale.

The film was widely criticized for the poor Irish accents of the three main Irish characters, with Tommy Lee Jones' portrayal of Ryan Gaerity particularly receiving the harshest criticism.

Home video
The VHS and Laserdisc of the film was released on December 14, 1994. It was released on DVD on July 29, 1997, while Kino Lorber (under license from MGM) released the film on a Blu-Ray in 2015.

Video game
The film also spawned a FMV video game tie-in for PC and Mac. It was developed by Imagination Pilots and published by IVI Publishing, Inc.

References

External links

 

1994 films
Films about terrorism in the United States
American films about revenge
Films set in Boston
Films shot in Boston
1990s English-language films
Independence Day (United States) films
English-language Irish films
Irish-language films
American action thriller films
American police detective films
Films about the Irish Republican Army
Films directed by Stephen Hopkins
Metro-Goldwyn-Mayer films
Films scored by Alan Silvestri
1994 action thriller films
Fictional portrayals of the Boston Police Department
1990s chase films
Films about bomb disposal
Films about The Troubles (Northern Ireland)
1990s American films